Wilhelm Franziskus "Willy" Jermann (19 April 1932 – 12 December 2020) was a Swiss footballer who played in the 1950s as defender in the late 1950s.

Jermann joined FC Basel's first team for their 1957–58 season under manager Rudi Strittich. After playing in one test match Jermann played his domestic league debut for the club in the home game at the Landhof on 29 December 1957 as Basel played a  1–1 draw against Lausanne-Sport.

Jermann played only this one season for Basel and played eight games. Five of these games were in the Nationalliga A and the other three were friendly games. For the following season Jermann moved on to play for FC Laufen.

References

Sources
 Rotblau: Jahrbuch Saison 2017/2018. Publisher: FC Basel Marketing AG. 
 Die ersten 125 Jahre. Publisher: Josef Zindel im Friedrich Reinhardt Verlag, Basel. 
 Verein "Basler Fussballarchiv" Homepage

FC Basel players
FC Laufen players
Swiss men's footballers
Association football defenders
1932 births
2020 deaths